James William Abert (November 18, 1820 – August 10, 1897) was an American soldier, explorer, bird collector and topographical artist.

Early life
Abert, the son of John James Abert, was born in Mount Holly Township, New Jersey, and graduated from West Point in 1842.

Military career
 Abert joined the Corps of Topographical Engineers, which was headed by his father, in 1843. He joined several expeditions into the west, including John Frémont's third expedition, and illustrated these expeditions reports with his sketches.  He was also put in charge of a detachment to map the Canadian River. 

In 1846 he was sent west to join the army of General Kearney in the war against Mexico, returning to Fort Leavenworth in the following year. It was during this time that he acquired a new species of bird, which was named the Abert's towhee in his honour. 

During the American Civil War, he served on the staffs of Robert Patterson, Nathaniel P. Banks and Quincy A. Gillmore. He was wounded during the Maryland Campaign, and retired from the Army in June 1864.

Later life
After the Civil War, he became a professor of English literature, mathematics and drawing at the University of Missouri. He was also a professor of civil engineering, applied mathematics, and engineering drawing at the Missouri School of Mines and Metallurgy (1872–1877). 

His original watercolors are now privately owned.

References

Who's Who in America, Historical Volume, 1607-1896. Chicago: Marquis Who's Who, 1967.

Further reading

External links
 
 Dianna Everett, " Abert Expedition." Encyclopedia of Oklahoma History and Culture.
 Career Profile

1820 births
1897 deaths
American explorers
Union Army colonels
United States Military Academy alumni
University of Missouri faculty
Missouri University of Science and Technology faculty
Artists from Columbia, Missouri
People from Mount Holly, New Jersey
People of New Jersey in the American Civil War
Explorers of Oregon
American collectors